Elmesthorpe was a railway station serving the village of Elmesthorpe in the Blaby district of Leicestershire, England. The station was opened in 1863 and closed in 1968.

References 

Disused railway stations in Leicestershire
Former Midland Railway stations
Railway stations in Great Britain opened in 1863
Railway stations in Great Britain closed in 1968
Beeching closures in England
Blaby